is a Japanese diver. She competed at the 1988 Summer Olympics, the 1992 Summer Olympics and the 1996 Summer Olympics.

References

1968 births
Living people
Japanese female divers
Olympic divers of Japan
Divers at the 1988 Summer Olympics
Divers at the 1992 Summer Olympics
Divers at the 1996 Summer Olympics
Sportspeople from Tokyo
Asian Games medalists in diving
Divers at the 1986 Asian Games
Divers at the 1990 Asian Games
Divers at the 1994 Asian Games
Asian Games bronze medalists for Japan
Medalists at the 1986 Asian Games
Medalists at the 1990 Asian Games
Medalists at the 1994 Asian Games
20th-century Japanese women